The Cordillera Quimsa Cruz is a mountain range in the La Paz Department in Bolivia situated south east of Lake Titicaca and north of Lake Uru Uru, measuring about 35–40 km in length and 12 km  at its widest point. It is the continuation of the Cordillera Real of Bolivia extending in a north to south-eastern direction from Asiento pass south of Illimani to Tres Cruces pass.

Kimsa Cruz or Quimsa Cruz in Hispanicized spelling is a partly Aymara (kimsa three), partly Spanish (cruz cross) expression meaning "three crosses".

Mountains 
The highest elevations are Jachacunocollo (5,800 m), Wayna Khunu Qullu (5,640 m) and Gigante (5,748 m). Other notable peaks are:

 León Jiwata,  
 San Luis,  
 Las Virgenes,  
 San Pedro,  
 Yaypuri,  
 Salvador Apacheta, 
 Jach'a Paquni,  
 San Enrique,  
 Atoroma,  
 Santa Fe,  
 San Juan,  
 San Lorenzo,  
 Janq'u Qullu,  
 La Salvadora,  
 Yunque,  
 Wila Qullu,  
 Nina Qullu,  
 Ch'amak Qullu, 
 Wallatani,  
 Quri Ch'uma,  
 Gerhard,  
 Los Enanos,  
 Mama Uqllu,  
 Cuernos de Diablo,  
 Chhankaphiña,  
 Santa Vera Cruz, 
 Pireo,  
 Janq'u Quta, 
 Achuma, 
 Ch'uxña Quta,  
 Taruja Umaña, 
 Janq'u Willk'i, 
 Kunturiri
 Laram Quta
 Malla Ch'uma

See also 
 Itapalluni
 Wisk'achani

References

Mountain ranges of Bolivia
Mountains of La Paz Department (Bolivia)